The Venerable Robert Cecil Sylvester Devenish (22 November 1888 – 23 August 1973) was Archdeacon of Lahore from 1934 to 1940.

He was educated at Trinity College, Dublin and ordained in 1913. He was a Chaplain to the Forces from 1915 to 1919 and then a Chaplain  with the Indian Ecclesiastical Establishment. He was Rector of St Paul's Naval and Garrison Church, Esquimalt from 1941 to 1946; Chaplain of Upper Chine School from 1946 to 1951 and Assistant Priest of St Mary Abbots, Kensington from  1951 to 1959.

Notes

1888 births
Alumni of Trinity College Dublin
Christianity in Lahore
Archdeacons of Lahore
1973 deaths